The 1st Grey Cup was played on December 4, 1909, between the Intercollegiate Rugby Football Union champion University of Toronto Varsity Blues and the Ontario Rugby Football Union champion Toronto Parkdale Canoe Club. The University of Toronto won the game, 26–6. While the Canadian Dominion Football Championship had been contested since 1884, this was the first such game that was awarded a trophy. This was the University of Toronto's third Dominion Championship and their fifth appearance in the national championship game. This was Toronto Parkdale's first appearance in a Dominion Championship game.

Game summary
U. of Toronto Varsity Blues (26) - TDs, Hugh Gall, Murray Thomson, Smirle Lawson; cons., Bill Ritchie; singles, Gall (8), Lawson (2).

Toronto Parkdale Canoe Club (6) - TD, Tom Meighan; single, Percy Killaly.

See also

References

01
1909 in Canadian football
Grey Cups hosted in Toronto
December 1909 sports events
1900s in Toronto
Toronto Varsity Blues football